Dartmouth—Cole Harbour (formerly Dartmouth and Dartmouth—Halifax East) is a federal electoral district in Nova Scotia, Canada, that has been represented in the House of Commons of Canada since 2004.

Demographics

From the 2021 census 

Ethnic groups:
European: 86.2%
African descent: 4.5%
Indigenous: 4.5%
South Asian: 1.1%
Other: 3.7%

Languages:
English: 92.7%
French: 3.1%
Arabic: 0.6%
Chinese: 0.5%
Other: 3.1%

Religions:
Protestant: 45.8%
Catholic: 38.1%
Other Christian: 1.4%
No religious affiliation: 12.9%

Education:
No certificate, diploma or degree: 20.7%
High school certificate: 24.5%
Apprenticeship or trade certificate or diploma: 10.2%
Community college, CEGEP or other non-university certificate or diploma: 20.4%
University certificate or diploma: 24.1%

Median Age:
40.5

Median total income:
$27,005

Average total income:
$34,363

Median household income:
$53,222

Average household income:
$64,493

Median family income:
$68,047

Average family income:
$77,776

Unemployment:
5.9%

Geography
The district includes the urban communities of Dartmouth and Cole Harbour in Halifax.

Political geography
The Liberals and the NDP were the two main parties in 2008. The NDP saw much of its support in West Dartmouth, around Topsail Lake, the northern part of Cole Harbour, and the communities of Imperoyal and Woodside as well as the Cole Harbour 30 Indian Reserve.  The Conservatives won two polls, both in Cole Harbour. The Liberals dominated in Central, Eastern and Northern Dartmouth and in southern Cole Harbour.

History
The riding of Dartmouth—Halifax East was created in 1966 when the former dual-member Halifax riding was split into two. The district consisted of the Dartmouth area, Bedford and most of eastern Halifax County. Bedford was moved to the riding of Halifax West in a 1976 redistribution. In 1987, the Dartmouth riding was created, taking in nearly all of the former territory of Dartmouth—Halifax East.

The electoral district of Dartmouth—Cole Harbour in 2004 was created from 86.8% of the population of the new riding came from Dartmouth, and 13.2% from Sackville—Musquodoboit Valley—Eastern Shore.

The 2012 federal electoral redistribution concluded that this riding will remain largely the same for the 42nd Canadian federal election. It lost a small fraction to the new riding of Sackville—Preston—Chezzetcook and gained a small portion (2%) from what was Sackville—Eastern Shore.

Member of Parliament

These ridings have elected the following Members of Parliament:

Election results

Dartmouth—Cole Harbour

2021 general election

Note that the Conservatives did not run a candidate in Dartmouth—Cole Harbour in the 2021 election, as their nominee withdrew shortly before the registration deadline.

2019 general election

2015 general election

2011 general election

2008 general election

2006 general election

2004 general election

Dartmouth

2000 general election

1997 general election

1993 general election

1988 general election

Dartmouth—Halifax East

1984 general election

1980 general election

1979 general election

1974 general election

1972 general election

1968 general election

See also
 List of Canadian federal electoral districts
 Past Canadian electoral districts

References

Notes

External links
 Riding history for Dartmouth—Halifax East (1966–1987) from the Library of Parliament
 Riding history for Dartmouth (1987–2003) from the Library of Parliament
 Riding history for Dartmouth—Cole Harbour (2003– ) from the Library of Parliament

Nova Scotia federal electoral districts
Dartmouth, Nova Scotia
Politics of Halifax, Nova Scotia